The  Saskatchewan Male U18 'AAA' Hockey League (SMAAAHL), formerly the Saskatchewan Midget AAA Hockey League,) is a U-18 'AAA' ice hockey league, with teams based in the province of Saskatchewan, Canada.  It is the highest level of minor hockey in the province.  Players in this league are 18 years of age or younger and often move on to play major junior hockey in the Western Hockey League or junior 'A' hockey in the Saskatchewan Junior Hockey League followed by college hockey in the United States.  Several have eventually gone on to professional hockey careers in the National Hockey League or in Europe.

Each year's playoff champion advances to the regional U-18 'AAA' championship, the winner of which earns a spot in the Telus Cup national championship.  Saskatchewan teams have won a combined 14 national titles since 1979. The Notre Dame Hounds won the 2018 Telus Cup becoming the first 5-time Champion.

Teams

SMAAAHL Alumni

External links
 SMAAAHL.com

Ice hockey leagues in Saskatchewan
Youth ice hockey leagues in Canada
Hockey Saskatchewan